Plectaster decanus, the mosaic sea star, is a species of sea star found off the south coast of Australia. It is the only species in the genus Plectaster.

Description

This five-armed starfish is distinguished by its very bright colors. A group of raised yellow ridges covers its red upper surface and it is soft in texture. Plectaster decanus is one of the few poisonous sea stars, and can cause numbness in humans if it is carried for any length of time.

Distribution and habitat
Plectaster decanus lives in rocky reefs off the southern coast of Australia.

Food
Plectaster decanus primarily feeds on sponges.

References

Echinasteridae
Fauna of the Pacific Ocean

Starfish described in 1843